David Eccles (May 12, 1849 – December 6, 1912) was an American businessman and industrialist who founded many businesses throughout the western United States and became Utah's first multimillionaire.

Biography 
Eccles was born in Paisley, Scotland, to William and Sarah Hutchinson Eccles.  In 1863 his family moved from Glasgow to the United States of America, sailing on the Cynosure and eventually settling in Ogden Valley, located in eastern Weber County, Utah.  The move was made because of their joining the Church of Jesus Christ of Latter-day Saints and their desire to be near the body of the church.  He lived in both Eden and Liberty, Utah.

After struggling to make a living, the family moved to Oregon City, Oregon.  There they worked in a new mill.  He worked for the mill for a year, then for a lumber corporation, and the Oregon and California Railroad.  The family moved back to Ogden, Utah, in 1869 after the completion of the Transcontinental Railroad hoping it would bring them work.

In the Ogden area, he worked cutting wood and building homes.  He worked as a freighter and for the Union Pacific coal mines.  He also worked at a sawmill at Monte Cristo east of Ogden.

In 1874, he attended Louis F. Moench's school in Ogden.  It was there he met Bertha Marie Jensen and married her in 1875.  They had 12 children from this marriage.

While he had been working he saved up a considerable amount of money and put it to other uses.  He started the Eccles Lumber Company and several other enterprises. Through supplying ties for railroads, he knew the local circumstances of where the railroads were building and the opportunities available.  He opened lumber mills, shingle mills, planing mills, an electric plant, and other entities.  He followed the railroads and opened mills in other locations in Oregon and Washington states.  He and his associates built the Sumpter Valley and Mount Hood railroads.  It was through these and other railroads that Eccles shipped the lumber and other goods to Utah.

Eccles met Ellen Stoddard, the daughter of his partner, John Stoddard.  Under the practice of polygamy at the time, David married Ellen, and they made their home in Logan, Utah where he built a lavish yellow brick mansion for his new bride using lumber imported from his corporation in Oregon.  (The home is on West Center Street.) Marriner Stoddard Eccles and George S. Eccles are children of this marriage.

While friends encouraged him to slow down, he preferred to "die in the harness." One of his hallmarks was integrity and self-reliance. His companies prospered on his no-debt plan and view of achieving success rather than money.

David always put his children to work early in life.  They worked along with the crews on the railroads, mills, and lumber yards.  They were taught as many aspects of the businesses as they were willing to learn.  Several served missions for The Church of Jesus Christ of Latter-day Saints.  His children graduated from University of Michigan Law School, Columbia University, Brigham Young College, Utah State University, and University of Utah.

With the estimated $4-7 million he made, mostly from his Oregon enterprises, he invested heavily in Utah. He purchased stock in banks, canneries, insurance companies, railroads, factories, mills, mines, and various other companies. David Eccles served as the second president of Utah Construction Company after the death of long-term associate Thomas Dee. He also served as founder of a number of companies, one of which was the Amalgamated Sugar Company.

Eccles served on the Ogden City Council and as their mayor from 1888 to 1890.  He was known for his aid to The Church of Jesus Christ of Latter-day Saints for lending large amounts of money to it at no interest.  At the time of his death, he was the president of 16 industrial corporations and 7 banks.  He also was serving as a director in 24 other banks and industries.  He is Utah's first multimillionaire.

While running to catch the evening train from Salt Lake City to Ogden, Utah, he died of a heart attack in Salt Lake City on December 6, 1912, at the age of 63.

There are a host of organizations named after Eccles and his descendants.  The David Eccles School of Business is at the University of Utah.  The David Eccles Conference Center is in downtown Ogden, Utah.
His relatives in the U.K include Leeds rugby player Graham Eccles.

Descendants 
Marriner Stoddard Eccles – son of David Eccles, was a US banker, economist, and Chairman of the Federal Reserve. The Eccles Building that houses the headquarters of the Federal Reserve in Washington, D.C. is named after him.
George S. Eccles – son of David Eccles, founder and CEO of the First Security Corporation and founder of the George S. and Dolores Dore Eccles Foundation
Spencer Eccles – grandson of David Eccles, a prominent financier and philanthropist in Salt Lake City, Utah and chairman emeritus of the Intermountain Region of Wells Fargo Corporation.

References

External links 

David Eccles family papers, 1934–1991
David Eccles photograph collection, 1850s–1910s

Businesspeople in the sugar industry
1849 births
1912 deaths
Businesspeople from Oregon
People from Logan, Utah
Businesspeople from Ogden, Utah
Converts to Mormonism
Scottish emigrants to the United States
Scottish Latter Day Saints
Businesspeople from Paisley, Renfrewshire
American sugar industry
19th-century American businesspeople
Mayors of places in Utah
Utah city council members
Eccles family
People from Weber County, Utah
19th-century Scottish businesspeople